Daund taluka is a taluka or subdivision of Pune district of the state of Maharashtra in India. The town of Daund is the only major urban area in this predominantly rural area. Daund railway station is a major railway junction. All southern railways are connected to this route, and also divided the Nagar railway to north Indian railway, like Delhi, Solapur division, Daund junction and then joined to the Pune district junction. To reach the Siddhi Vinayak Siddhatek Ganpati temple, one has to travel 14 km to Daund by road.

In the winter season, when the temperature drops to 19 to 20℃, Daund has the most agricultural production of sugarcane. The riverbank farmers mostly plant sugarcane as their seasonal crop. The back water of the Ujani Dam riverbed region has Acacia tree forest. Many thorned-trees are found in this region. Three sugar factories are available in Daund 1)Daund sugar limited, Alegaon 2)Bhima Patas, Patas 3)Anuraj sugar limited, Yavat.

See also
 Talukas in Pune districteast at ahmednagar district, karjat-jamkhed taluka.
 Deulgaon Gada

The Daund taluka and Pune district divided by the Bhima river from the adjoining Ahmednagar district. People of Daund have many gardening house on the Bhima river. The bhima river joins many of the sub-rivers. Some villages are getting the back water of Ujani Dam .
दौंड तालुका पुणे जिल्ह्यातील प्रमुख तालुका आहे
In Daund there is a Kurkumbh MIDC.

References

Talukas in Pune district
Talukas in Maharashtra